Johannes Canuti Lenaeus (29 November 1573 – 23 April 1669) was a professor at Uppsala University and Archbishop of Uppsala in the Church of Sweden.

Biography 
Lenaeus was born at Länna parish in Uppland, Sweden where his father was parish  priest.  After several years of studies, mainly in Germany at universities in Rostock and Wittenberg, he was appointed professor of logic at Uppsala University in 1604. After being ordained priest, he was in 1613 also appointed   deputy vice-rector and professor of theology.  After more studies in Germany, he was also appointed professor in Greek and Hebrew. In 1638, he was named the first theology professor and clergyman at Uppsala. Lenaeus was appointed Archbishop in 1647. 

He text he wrote, Logica peripatetica (1633), gave a revival to the philosophy of peripatetics (Aristotelian philosophy).

Lenaeus was married in 1612 with Catharina Kenicia, daughter of  Petrus Kenicius who was Archbishop of Uppsala from 1609 to his death in 1636.

References

Other sources
 Nordisk Familjebok (1912), article Lenaeus

1573 births
1669 deaths
People from Uppland
 Wittenberg University alumni
Academic staff of Uppsala University
Lutheran archbishops of Uppsala
17th-century Lutheran archbishops
16th-century Swedish people
17th-century Swedish people